Mul Rural LLG is a local-level government (LLG) of Western Highlands Province, Papua New Guinea.

Wards
01. Bukapena
02. Kileg.1
03. Kileg.2
04. Kileg.3
05. Kalenga 1
06. Kalenga 2
07. Wurup
08. Kwinga.1
09. Kwinga.2
10. Kwinga.3
11. Kwinga.4
12. Bita
13. Kum
14. Mabulga.1
15. Mabulga.2
16. Mabulga.3
17. Mambuga.4
18. Rugli.1
19. Rugli.2
20. Keregamp
21. Kopalge
22. Kumdi
23. Namba
24. Murip
25. Kiliga
26. Minimp
27. Koibuga.1
28. Koibuga.2
29. Koibuga.3
30. Koibuga.4
31. Angiki.1
32. Angiki.2
33. Kilimp
34. Wara.1
35. Wara.2
36. Wara.3
37. Kogl
38. Kwip.1
39. Kwip.2
40. Tondomong.1
41. Tondomong.2
42. Tondomong.3
43. Balk.1
44. Balk.2
45. Balk.3
46. Balk.4
47. Ebuga

References

Local-level governments of Western Highlands Province